The 1938 Santa Ana air show disaster occurred on 24 July 1938 at a military review on the Campo de Marte in the Santa Ana district of Bogota, Colombia. During the review, a Curtiss Hawk II biplane of the Colombian Air Force piloted by Lieutenant César Abadia performed a stunt before crashing into a grandstand and then into the crowd.

The pilot attempted to fly between the presidential stand and the stand for diplomats when he miscalculated the distance and the aircraft's wing-tip struck the diplomatic stand. The Hawk II destroyed part of the roof of the presidential stand and then careened through the crowd bursting into flames before it came to a stop upside down. Over fifty people, including civilians and soldiers were killed, and over a hundred injured. Among those in the presidential stand but uninjured were the outgoing Colombian President Alfonso López Pumarejo and his successor Eduardo Santos. Among the wounded was Misael Pastrana Borrero, a future president of Colombia.

See also
Lists of air show accidents and incidents
Sknyliv air show disaster – another air show disaster caused by a single military aircraft and resulting in over 50 fatalities

References

Aviation accidents and incidents in Colombia
1938 in Colombia
Aviation accidents and incidents in 1938
Aviation accidents and incidents at air shows
July 1938 events